Liguri Mosulishvili (10 June 1933 – 5 April 2010) was a Georgian physicist and Head of Biophysics Department at Andronikashvili Institute of Physics of Tbilisi State University.

Biography 
Liguri Mosulishvili was born in 1933, in Arashenda village, Gurjaani Municipality, Georgia. He was trained as a physicist at the Tbilisi State University (1953–1958). In 1958 by the invitation Elephter Andronikashvili he has begun work as the junior researcher in Andronikashvili Institute of Physics.

In 1968 Liguri Mosulishvili was the Candidate of Ph.D. in Physical and Mathematical Sciences (Experimental Physics) at Tbilisi State University, Georgia. He received his Ph.D. in Biophysics (Nuclear Physics and Biophysics), at Andronikashvili Institute of Physics of Tbilisi State University in 1985. His major research interests was Life Sciences, Ecology, Biophysics, Molecular biology, Neutron activation analysis and Experimental physics. 

A small book of memoirs Episodes from life of physicists by Liguri Mosulishvili (edited by Miho Mosulishvili, which is the son of Liguri Mosulishvili's brother), was published in 2010.

Working experience
 2004-2006 — Principal Investigator, Andronikashvili institute of Physics
 1990-2004 — Head of the department, Andronikashvili Institute of Physics
 1961-1990 — Head of the Laboratory, Andronikashvili Institute of Physics
 1958-1961 — Junior Researcher, Andronikashvili institute of Physics

The Scientific Projects
 2000-2002 — ISTC  project G-348 'Molecular Mechanisms of Heavy Metal Transformation on Microbial-Mineral Surfaces, their Roles in Detoxifying High-Oxidation State Cr and Other Heavy Metal Ions', Collaborators: Lawrence Berkeley National Laboratory, USA, CA, Berkeley
 2001-2003 — ISTC project G-349 'In Vitro Study of Mechanisms of Intracellular Responses to Low-Dose and Low-Dose Rate Exposure to Cr(VI) Compounds', Collaborators: Lawrence Berkeley National Laboratory, USA, CA, Berkeley
 2001-2004 — ISTC project G-408 'Neutron-Activation Analysis of Blue-Green Alga Spirulina Platensis: Heavy and Toxic Elements Accumulation from Nutrient Medium in the Process of Cell Growth' (Project manager), Project collaborator David C Glasgow
 2002-2003 — The International Atomic Energy Agency (IAEA) Coordinated Research Programme (CRP) Contract N11528/RBF, 'Selenium Containing Blue-Green Algae Spirulina Platensis for Preventive Health Care Investigated by Nuclear Techniques'

Georgian grants
 2004–2005 — 2.32.04. The study of toxic metals absorption and accumulation by algae Spirulina platensis (Project manager)
 2000–2001 — 2.25. The study of physical-chemical properties of procaryotic systems under loading with toxic metals (Project manager)
 1997–1999 — 2.22. Study of Cd(II) interaction with biomacromolecules in vivo and in vitro experiments (Project manager)

The scientific contacts

 1999-2006 — Joint Institute for Nuclear Research, Dubna, Russia
 2004-2006 — Sapienza University of Rome, Italy
 2000-2005 — Oak Ridge National Laboratory, USA
 1975-1985 — Dresden Generating Station, Germany
 1970-1975 — Saulce sur Rhône (Loriol Le Pouzin Dam), France
 1964-1987 — Reactor of Tashkent, Uzbekistan

Awards
 2005 — Incentive prize of Joint Institute for Nuclear Research for research 'Using of neutron activation analysis for development of the new medical preparations and sorbents on the blue-green alga Spirulina platenis basis', Dubna (Russia), N 3108.
 2002 — Contest of Scientific, methodological and applied works of Laboratory of Neutron Physics (LNF), Second premium. Using of neutron activation analysis for development of the new medical preparations

Publications
 Episodes from life of physicists (A notebook of memoirs), Published 2010 by Saari in Tbilisi, Georgia
 Liguri Mosulishvili, Nelly Tsibakhashvili, Elene Kirkesali, Linetta Tsertsvadze, Marina Frontasyeva, Sergei Pavlov - Biotechnology in Georgia for Various Applications, BULLETIN OF THE GEORGIAN NATIONAL ACADEMY OF SCIENCES, vol. 2, no. 3, 2008  
  L.M. Mosulishvili, E.I. Kirkesali, A.I. Belokobylsky, A.I. Khizanishvili, M.V. Frontasyeva, S.S. Pavlov, S.S. Gundorina (2002), J. Pharm. Biomed. Anal., 30(1): 87.
  L.M. Mosulishvili, E.I. Kirkesali, A.I. Belokobylsky, A.I. Khizanishvili, M.V. Frontasyeva, S.F. Gundorina, C.D. Oprea (2002), J. Radioanal. Nucl. Chem. Articles, 252 (1): 15–20.
  L.M. Mosulishvili, M.V. Frontasyeva, S.S. Pavlov, A.I. Belokobylsky, E.I. Kirkesali, A.I. Khizanishvili (2004), J. Radioanal. Nucl. Chem., 259 (1): 41–45.
  A.I. Belokobylsky, E.N. Ginturi, N.E. Kuchava, E.I. Kirkesali, L.M. Mosulishvili, M.V. Frontasyeva, S.S. Pavlov, N.G. Aksenova (2004), J. Radioanal. Nucl. Chem., 259 (1), 65–68.
  L.M. Mosulishvili, A.I. Belokobylsky, E.I. Kirkesali, M.V. Frontasyeva, S.S. Pavlov, N.G. Aksenova (2007), J. Neutron Res., 15(1): 49.
  M.V. Frontasyeva, E.I. Kirkesali, N.G. Aksenova, L.M. Mosulishvili, A.I. Belokobylsky, A.I. Khizanishvili (2006), J. Neutron Res., 14 (2): 1–7.
  L.M. Mosulishvili, A.I. Belokobylsky, A.I. Khizanishvili, E.I. Kirkesali, M.V. Frontasyeva, S.S. Pavlov (2001), Patent of RF No. 2209077, priority of March 15.
 L. M. Mosulishvili, A. I. Belokobylsky, E.I. Kirkesali, M.V. Frontasyeva, S.S. Pavlov (2002), Patent of RF No. 2230560, priority of June 11.
 N.Ya. Tsibakhashvili, M.V. Frontasyeva, E.I. Kirkesali, N.G. Aksenova, T.L. Kalabegishvili, I.G. Murusidze, L.M. Mosulishvili, H.-Y.N. Holman (2006), Anal. Chem. 78: 6285–6290.
 N.Ya. Tsibakhashvili, L.M. Mosulishvili, E.I. Kirkesali, T.L. Kalabegishvili, M.V. Frontasyeva, E.V. Pomyakushina, S.S. Pavlov (2004). J. Radioanal. Nucl. Chem., 259 (3): 527–531.
 N. Tsibakhahsvili, T. Kalabegishvili, L. Mosulishvili, E. Kirkesali, S. Kerkenjia, I. Murusidze, H.-Y. Holman, M.V. Frontasyeva, S.F. Gundorina (2008), J. Radioanal. Nucl. Chem. (accepted). 
 N. Tsibakhashvili, N. Asatiani, M. Abuladze, B. Birkaya, N. Sapozhnikova, L. Mosulishvili, H.-Y. Holman (2002), Biomed. Chrom., 16: 327.

References

External links
 Episodes from life of physicists (A notebook of memoirs) by Liguri Mosulishvili, Saari Publishing House, 2010 (in Georgian)
 L. M. Mosulishvili's scientific contributions
 ACCUMULATION OF TRACE ELEMENTS BY BIOLOGICAL MATRICE OF Spirulina platensis
 Determination of the pI of Human Rhinovirus Serotype 2 by Capillary Isoelectric Focusing
 The binding strength of Cd(II) to C-phycocyanin from Spirulina platensis
 Capillary electrophoresis of Cr(VI) reducer Arthrobacter oxydans
 Accumulation of trace elements by biological matrice of Spirulina platensis
 Epithermal neutron activation analysis of Cr(VI)-reducer basalt-inhabiting bacteria
 Patents of the author Mosulishvili Liguri Mikhaylovich (in russian)

Physicists from Georgia (country)
Experimental physicists
20th-century physicists
1933 births
2010 deaths
Scientists from Tbilisi
Tbilisi State University alumni
Biophysicists